Engelhardia serrata is a species of tree in the family Juglandaceae. It is native to southwest China, Indo-China, Indonesia, and the Philippines.

Varieties 
The following are recognised:
 Engelhardia serrata var. serrata: from Indonesia and the Philippines
 Engelhardia serrata var. cambodica (Kurz) W.E. Manning: China (SW-Yunnan), Cambodia, India, Laos, Myanmar [Burma], Thailand and Vietnam

Description
Engelhardia serrata is a tree growing up to 12 m tall. The leaves are pinnate, rarely unpaired, and 150–250 mm long. The petiole is 10–20 mm long and hairy; the rachis is also hairy. The 6 to 14 leaflets are seated or short stalked, the blade is elliptic to elliptic-lanceolate, 60–130 mm long and 25–45 mm wide, the underside is hairy. The leaf margin is irregularly or completely serrated, the end is pointed or briefly pointed.

The fruits are spherical nuts, about 3 mm in size and rough-haired, typically maturing is in April. The wings are rough-haired at the base, the middle wing is 20–25 mm long, others about 13 mm.

References

External links

Fagales
serrata
Flora of Indo-China
Trees of Vietnam